John H. and Mary Abercrombie House is a historic home located at Fort Wayne, Indiana.  It was built about 1914, and is a two-story, side gabled, Tudor Revival style brick and half-timber dwelling.  It has American Craftsman style design elements including wide gabled porches, exposed rafter ends, and a porte cochere.

It was listed on the National Register of Historic Places in 2013.

References

Houses on the National Register of Historic Places in Indiana
Tudor Revival architecture in Indiana
Houses completed in 1914
National Register of Historic Places in Fort Wayne, Indiana
Houses in Fort Wayne, Indiana